Scurria zebrina is a species of sea snail, a true limpet, a marine gastropod mollusk in the family Lottiidae, one of the families of true limpets.

Description
The length of the shell attains 21.3 mm.

Distribution
This marine species occurs off Chile.

References

 Nakano T. & Ozawa T. (2007). Worldwide phylogeography of limpets of the order Patellogastropoda: molecular, morphological and paleontological evidence. Journal of Molluscan Studies 73(1): 79–99.

External links
Zoologie, sér. Zoologie, vol. 2(1), p. 241–471., 16 pls

Lottiidae
Gastropods described in 1830
Taxa named by René Lesson